Godiasco Salice Terme (Western Lombard: Gudiass) is a comune (municipality) in the Province of Pavia in the Italian region Lombardy, located about 60 km south of Milan and about 30 km south of Pavia.

Geography
The municipality of Godiasco Salice Terme contains the hamlets (frazioni) of Alta Collina, Casa Bedaglia, Casa Belloni, Cascina Morosini, Gomo, Montalfeo, Montegarzano, Piumesana, Sala Superiore, Salice Terme, San Bartolomeo, San Desiderio, San Giovanni and Verone. Salice is the most populated hamlet and a spa town.

Godiasco Salice Terme borders the following municipalities: Casalnoceto, Cecima, Montesegale, Ponte Nizza, Pozzol Groppo, Rivanazzano Terme, Rocca Susella, Volpedo.

References

Cities and towns in Lombardy
Spa towns in Italy